Multitech Business School (MBS) is a privately owned institution of higher education, which offers degree, diploma and certificate courses in multiple business disciplines, in Uganda. It is recognized by the Uganda National Council for Higher Education, as a private, tertiary degree-awarding institution of higher learning.

Location
The main campus of MBS is located at the corner of Sir  Apollo Kaggwa Road and Kyaddondo Road, in Kampala, the capital and largest city in the country. The geographical coordinates of the school's main campus are:0°19'28.0"N, 32°33'54.0"E (Latitude:0.324444; Longitude:32.565000).

The school maintains two other campuses, one in the town of Hoima, and another campus in Kakiri. As of 2011, MBS also had training centres in ten other Ugandan towns, namely Arua, Gulu, Fort Portal, Hoima, Kabale, Kitgum, Lira, Masaka, Mbale and Soroti.

History
MBS was founded in 1989 to provide training for professional accountants pursuing awards of various professional bodies, including the Institute of Certified Public Accountants of Kenya, the Association of Chartered Certified Accountants and the Chartered Institute of Procurement & Supply. Later, when the Institute of Certified Public Accountants of Uganda (ICPAU) was established, MBS trained accountants for those examinations as well. According to the MBS Principal, approximately 60 percent of Uganda's professional accountants have received some training from the school. In 2013, the school received accreditation to offer certificate and diplomas in certain business disciplines. In 2016, the institution was licensed to offer degrees as well. As of December 2011, the school had a student population in excess of 1,600 in 13 locations across Uganda.

Academic courses
 Postgraduate courses
The following postgraduate courses have a training duration of one year.
 Postgraduate Diploma in Business Administration and Management
 Postgraduate Diploma in Public Administration and Management
 Postgraduate Diploma in Procurement and Logistics Management

 Undergraduate courses
The following degree courses have a training duration of three years.
 Bachelor in Business Administration and Management, with options in Finance, Accounting, Marketing, Human Resource Management, Procurement & Logistics Management
 Bachelors of Science in Accounting & Finance
 Bachelors of Science in Computer Science
 Bachelors of Business Computing
 Bachelors of Information Technology
 Bachelors of Procurement and Logistics Management
 Bachelor In Mass Communication And Journalism
 Bachelors of Micro Finance Management
 Bachelors of Science in Records Management and Informatics Technology	
 Bachelors of Banking and Finance

 Diploma courses
The following diploma courses have a training duration of two years.
 Diploma in Business Administration and Management
 Diploma in Public Administration and Management
 Diploma in Procurement and Logistics Management
 Diploma in Accounting & Finance
 Diploma in Computer Science
 Diploma in Business Computing
 Diploma in Information Technology
 Diploma in Human Resource Management
 Diploma in Mass Communication and Journalism
 Diploma in Hotel, Travel and Tourism Management	
 Diploma in Secretarial and Office Management	
 Diploma in Radio and Television Production
 Diploma in Micro Finance Management
 Diploma in Fashion and Design
 Diploma in Hotel and Restaurant Management
 Diploma in Culinary Arts
 Diploma in Hair Dressing and Beauty Therapy
 Diploma in Early Childhood Education

 Certificate courses
The following certificate courses have a training duration of two years.

 Certificate in Business Administration and Management
 Certificate in Secretarial and Office Management

 Other courses
Other courses on offer include, (a) Professional ICT Courses (b) Professional accounting courses and (c) Short term courses.

Prominent alumni
Lydia Jazmine, a Ugandan female recording artist.

See also
List of business schools in Uganda
List of universities in Uganda
Education in Uganda

References

External links
 Website of Multitech Business School

Universities and colleges in Uganda
Business schools in Uganda
Educational institutions established in 1989
1989 establishments in Uganda
Kampala Central Division
Education in Kampala